Seal Chart is a village  east of Sevenoaks in Kent, England. It is within the Sevenoaks local government district. It is in the civil parish of Seal.

External links

Villages in Kent